Kevin D. Chambliss (born June 8, 1981) is an American politician serving as a member of the Florida House of Representatives from the 117th district. He assumed office on November 3, 2020.

Early life and education 
Chambliss was born in Columbus, Mississippi. He earned a Bachelor of Science degree in psychology from Jackson State University.

Career 
Chambliss worked as a field organizer for the Florida Democratic Party and as the South Dade political director for Joe Garcia's 2012 congressional campaign. He later worked as a congressional liaison for Debbie Mucarsel-Powell and Donna Shalala. Chambliss was elected to the Florida House of Representatives in November 2020. He is a member of the House State Affairs Committee.

References

External links
Kevin Chambliss - My Florida House Page

1981 births
Living people
People from Columbus, Mississippi
Jackson State University alumni
Democratic Party members of the Florida House of Representatives
African-American state legislators in Florida
People from Homestead, Florida
21st-century African-American people
20th-century African-American people